Old Bull Lee, a subsidiary of Mockingbird Industries Inc., is a United States-based retail and online clothing brand rooted in the culture and lifestyle of California and of the East Coast of United States. The company sells men's shorts, shirts and boardshorts of domestic and imported fabrics. As of July 2017, the company operates online and in select boutiques in North America and Asia.  Old Bull Lee is headquartered in Manhattan Beach, California.

History

Lee W. Johnson studied architecture at the Southern California Institute of Architecture (SCI-Arc) graduating in the mid-1990s. He left architecture during 2008, and in 2012, he founded the brand Old Bull Lee, a men's clothing operation. To make his shorts, Johnson meet with Italian and French textile manufacturers who introduced him to "stress free" fabric. The shorts are made of cotton-linen blends, plain weaves and twills. Prints are a trademark of many of the Old Bull Lee products.

Johnson named his new clothing company Old Bull Lee, a literary reference from Jack Kerouac's book On the Road, which featured a character called Bull Lee who was modeled after author William S. Burroughs.

In 2017, after a few years producing and selling shorts and button-down shirts, Old Bull Lee expanded their line to include a boardshort category. Lee chose to manufacture in Orange County, California, because of its notability for surfer culture.

References

External links

Clothing companies of the United States
Companies based in Los Angeles County, California
Manhattan Beach, California
2011 establishments in California
Clothing companies established in 2011
Retail companies established in 2011
Internet properties established in 2011